Thomas Trodd (1842 – 26 July 1908) was an English first-class cricketer active 1879–80 who played for Surrey. He was born in Cobham; died in Macclesfield.

References

1842 births
1908 deaths
English cricketers
Surrey cricketers
London United Eleven cricketers